The World Association of Universities and Colleges (WAUC) is an institutional educational accreditation body not recognized by the United States Department of Education.  It is run by Maxine Asher, director of the American World University, an unaccredited school. WAUC's website claims that "laws in the U.S.A. prohibit the recognition of global accreditation associations".

History
According to Maxine Asher's American World University, World Association of Universities and Colleges was started in 1992.

In March 2001, WAUC was reported to be using an executive suite in Henderson, Nevada as its address.

In 2004, Asher was forced to close down the World University of Iowa, a Hawaii-based institution similar to American World University and accredited by World Association of Universities and Colleges. As part of a summary judgement, she was ordered to cease operations, refund tuition money to all students, and pay $240,000 in damages. The action came as part of a statewide crackdown on unaccredited schools, as many had relocated there after 1999 in an effort to evade regulation in the mainland United States. During court proceedings, Asher refused to provide school documentation such as a list of students.

In June 2007, the organization's website listed an address in Beverly Hills, California and WAUC listed 57 accredited schools and 28 nonaccredited "members only" schools. In 2010, it offered accreditation for limited time offer at $500.

As of September 2011, WAUC's website was offline.

In 2012, the World Association of Universities and Colleges claims "a membership of forty universities, with dozens of other worthy institutions in the process of application.".

Schools listed as "accredited" by WAUC
As of 2008, WAUC listed the following as accredited members:

Abbot Institute of Modern Sciences (United Kingdom)
Alhuraa University (Netherlands; operated by Iraqi academics living outside of Iraq)
American Global University School of Medicine
American International University of Learning
American International University of Management and Technology
American Middle East University
American Northeastate University
American University of London
American World University
Arab Open Academy in Denmark
Atlantic National University
Barron University
Bolton International University
Buckingham College (United Kingdom)
California University of Management Science
Cambridge International University (Spain)
Cambridge State University
Central School of Professional Studies
City School of Commerce and Technology (United Kingdom)
City University (located in Pacific time zone; not to confused with the City University of Hong Kong, London, New York, or Seattle)
College of Applied Sciences (United Kingdom)
College of Management and Technology (United Kingdom)
Columbus University
European Business School (California; not to be confused with other schools of the same name)
European University of Lefke
Foundation University (Netherlands; not to be confused with Foundation University of Philippines)
Freie Und Private Universitaet Sersi (Switzerland)
Hegel International University
Huntington Pacific University
International School of Management (ISM)
International University of America/Management Education Resource Centre (MERC Education Group)
Keller International University
Laureate University (United States and United Kingdom)
Lincoln College of London (United Kingdom)
London College of Technology and Research (United Kingdom) (accreditation in-process)
Madison University (not to be confused with University of Wisconsin–Madison or James Madison University)
Medical University of the Americas Belize
Medical University of the Americas UK
Mist University
Royal Netherlands Academy of Arts and Sciences
St. John's College (London)
TEC Institute of Management
Thompson International University
Universal Church of the Master
Universal Studies Academy (Gaza, Palestine, Israel)
Universidad Central
Universidad de los Pueblos de Europa (Spain)
Universidad Internacional De Las Américas
Universidad Ortodoxa de las Americas Inc. (Puerto Rico)
Universidad y Seminano Apostilico de las Americas Inc (Puerto Rico)
University of Central Europe (California)
University of Global Religious Studies
University of Health Science
University of James
Van Holland University (The Netherlands)
Virtual American International University
Washington InterContinental University
Wisdom University
York University (Mobile, Alabama) (not to be confused with York University of Toronto or with the University of York)

See also
 Accreditation mill
 Diploma mill
 List of unaccredited institutions of higher learning
 List of unrecognized accreditation associations of higher learning

References

External links

Accrediting bodies NOT recognized by the United States Department of Education

Unrecognized accreditation associations